Criton of Pieria (Greek: Κρίτων Πιεριώτης, Πιερ(ι)εύς; Latin Crito Pieriota, Pieriotes, Pierius, Pierensis) was a 2nd-century Greek historian.

Titles of works

Παλληνικά, Pallenica, On Pallene
Συρακουσῶν κτίσις, The Foundation of Syracuse
Περσικά, Persica, On Persia
Σικελικά, Siculica, On Sicily
Συρακουσῶν περιήγησις, Description of Syracuse
Περὶ τῆς ἀρχῆς τῶν Μακεδόνων, On the Empire of the Macedonians

References

Ancient Library.4
Studies in Ancient Society by Moses I. Finley
Bibliothecae by Johann Albert Fabricius

Greek-language historians from the Roman Empire
Ancient Macedonian historians
Writers of lost works
2nd-century historians
2nd-century Greek people
Roman-era Macedonians
Ancient Pierians